Lewis H. Mills House may refer to:

Lewis H. Mills House (1916), Portland, Oregon, listed on the National Register of Historic Places in Northwest Portland, Oregon
Lewis H. Mills House (1929), Portland, Oregon, listed on the National Register of Historic Places in Multnomah County, Oregon

See also
Mills House (disambiguation)